Mitochondrial translational release factor 1, also known as MTRF1 is a human gene.

The protein encoded by this gene directs the termination of translation in response to the peptide chain termination codons. Initially thought to have a role in the termination of mitochondria protein synthesis. mtRF1 has been hypothesized to recognize non-standard stop codons AGA and AGG in vertebrates. Alternatively, based on detailed 3D modelling, it has been proposed to recognize stalled ribosomes in which a tRNA is still bound to the peptide chain, but in which the A-site of the ribosome is empty.

References

Further reading

 

Genes on human chromosome 13